The 2008 Major League Baseball First-Year Player Draft continued Major League Baseball's annual amateur draft of high school and college baseball players, and was held on June 5 and 6, 2008.

First round selections
Key

Supplemental first round selections

Compensation picks

Other notable players

Kyle Lobstein, 2nd round, 47th overall by the Tampa Bay Rays
Tanner Scheppers, 2nd round, 48th overall by the Pittsburgh Pirates
Johnny Giavotella, 2nd round, 49th overall by the Kansas City Royals
Xavier Avery, 2nd round, 50th overall by the Baltimore Orioles
Anthony Gose, 2nd round, 51st overall by the Philadelphia Phillies
Brad Hand, 2nd round, 52nd overall by the Florida Marlins
Robbie Ross, 2nd round, 57th overall by the Texas Rangers
Tyson Ross, 2nd round, 58th overall by the Oakland Athletics
Shane Peterson, 2nd round, 59th overall by the St. Louis Cardinals
Tyler Ladendorf, 2nd round, 59th overall by the Minnesota Twins
Josh Lindblom, 2nd round, 60th overall by the Los Angeles Dodgers
Cody Satterwhite, 2nd round, 67th overall by the Detroit Tigers
James Darnell, 2nd round, 69th overall by the San Diego Padres
Zeke Spruill, 2nd round, 70th overall by the Atlanta Braves
Charlie Blackmon, 2nd round, 72nd overall by the Colorado Rockies
Bryan Shaw, 2nd round, 73rd overall by the Arizona Diamondbacks
Tyler Chatwood, 2nd round, 74th overall by the Los Angeles Angels of Anaheim
Jordy Mercer, 3rd round, 79th overall by the Pittsburgh Pirates
L. J. Hoes, 3rd round, 81st overall by the Baltimore Orioles
Roger Kieschnick, 3rd round, 82nd overall by the San Francisco Giants
Edgar Olmos, 3rd round, 83rd overall by the Florida Marlins
Zach Stewart, 3rd round, 84th overall by the Cincinnati Reds
Stephen Fife, 3rd round, 85th overall by the Boston Red Sox
Brent Morel, 3rd round, 86th overall by the Chicago White Sox
Danny Espinosa, 3rd round, 87th overall by the Washington Nationals
Logan Schafer, 3rd round, 94th overall by the Milwaukee Brewers
Craig Kimbrel, 3rd round, 96th overall by the Atlanta Braves
Chris Carpenter, 3rd round, 97th overall by the Chicago Cubs
Kirk Nieuwenhuis, 3rd round, 100th overall by the New York Mets
Blake Tekotte, 3rd round, 101st overall by the San Diego Padres
Vance Worley, 3rd round, 102nd overall by the Philadelphia Phillies
David Adams, 3rd round, 106th overall by the New York Yankees
Cord Phelps, 3rd round, 107th overall by the Cleveland Indians
Kyle Weiland, 3rd round, 108th overall by the Boston Red Sox
Jonathan Pettibone, 3rd round, 110th overall by the Philadelphia Phillies
Chase d'Arnaud, 4th round, 114th overall by the Pittsburgh Pirates
Tim Melville, 4th round, 115th overall by the Kansas City Royals
Kyle Hudson, 4th round, 116th overall by the Baltimore Orioles
Brandon Crawford, 4th round, 117th overall by the San Francisco Giants
Joe Wieland, 4th round, 123rd overall by the Texas Rangers
Dee Gordon, 4th round, 127th overall by the Los Angeles Dodgers
Jason Kipnis, 4th round, 135th overall by the San Diego Padres, but did not sign
Trevor May, 4th round, 136th overall by the Philadelphia Phillies
Buddy Boshers, 4th round, 139th overall by the Los Angeles Angels of Anaheim
Corban Joseph, 4th round, 140th overall by the New York Yankees
Justin Wilson, 5th round, 144th overall by the Pittsburgh Pirates
John Lamb, 5th round, 145th overall by the Kansas City Royals
Daniel Hudson, 5th round, 150th overall by the Chicago White Sox
Adrian Nieto, 5th round, 151st overall by the Washington Nationals
Jermaine Curtis, 5th round, 155th overall by the St. Louis Cardinals
Tyler Pastornicky, 5th round, 159th overall by the Toronto Blue Jays
Alex Avila, 5th round, 163rd overall by the Detroit Tigers
Anthony Bass, 5th round, 165th overall by the San Diego Padres
Chris Dominguez, 5th round, 167th overall by the Colorado Rockies
Collin Cowgill, 5th round, 168th overall by the Arizona Diamondbacks
Zach Putnam, 5th round, 171st overall by the Cleveland Indians
Robbie Grossman, 6th round, 174th overall by the Pittsburgh Pirates
Eric Surkamp, 6th round, 177th overall by the San Francisco Giants
J. B. Shuck, 6th round, 182nd overall by the Houston Astros
Richard Bleier, 6th round, 183rd overall by the Texas Rangers
Eric Fornataro, 6th round, 185th overall by the St. Louis Cardinals
Josh Harrison, 6th round, 191st overall by the Chicago Cubs
Josh Satin, 6th round, 194th overall by the New York Mets
Cole Figueroa, 6th round, 195th overall by the San Diego Padres
Brett Marshall, 6th round, 200th overall by the New York Yankees
Ryan Lavarnway, 6th round, 202nd overall by the Boston Red Sox
Caleb Joseph, 7th round, 206th overall by the Baltimore Orioles
Pedro Villarreal, 7th round, 209th overall by the Cincinnati Reds
Jordan Danks, 7th round, 210th overall by the Chicago White Sox
Eric Thames, 7th round, 219th overall by the Toronto Blue Jays
Paul Clemens, 7th round, 220th overall by the Atlanta Braves
Will Smith, 7th round, 229th overall by the Los Angeles Angels of Anaheim
Tim Federowicz, 7th round, 232nd overall by the Boston Red Sox
Scott Barnes, 8th round, 237th overall by the San Francisco Giants
Nick Buss, 8th round, 247th overall by the Los Angeles Dodgers
Erik Komatsu, 8th round, 248th overall by the Milwaukee Brewers
Evan Crawford, 8th round, 249th overall by the Toronto Blue Jays
Brett Oberholtzer, 8th round, 250th overall by the Atlanta Braves
Bobby LaFromboise, 8th round, 252nd overall by the Seattle Mariners
Andy Dirks, 8th round, 253rd overall by the Detroit Tigers
Eric Campbell, 8th round, 254th overall by the New York Mets
Matt Hague, 9th round, 264th overall by the Pittsburgh Pirates
Ryan Verdugo, 9th round, 267th overall by the San Francisco Giants
Dan Jennings, 9th round, 268th overall by the Florida Marlins
Dave Sappelt, 9th round, 269th overall by the Cincinnati Reds
Jay Jackson, 9th round, 281st overall by the Chicago Cubs
Christian Vázquez, 9th round, 292nd overall by the Boston Red Sox
Chris Herrmann, 10th round, 296th overall by the Baltimore Orioles
Tommy Milone, 10th round, 301st overall by the Washington Nationals
Alex Castellanos, 10th round, 305th overall by the St. Louis Cardinals
Danny Farquhar, 10th round, 309th overall by the Toronto Blue Jays
J. J. Hoover, 10th round, 310th overall by the Atlanta Braves
Alex Wilson, 10th round, 311th overall by the Chicago Cubs
Robbie Weinhardt, 10th round, 313th overall by the Detroit Tigers
Andrew Albers, 10th round, 315th overall by the San Diego Padres
D. J. Mitchell, 10th round, 320th overall by the New York Yankees
Charles Leesman, 11th round, 330th overall by the Chicago White Sox
Nathan Eovaldi, 11th round, 337th overall by the Los Angeles Dodgers
Dustin Antolin, 11th round, 339th overall by the Toronto Blue Jays
Michael Stutes, 11th round, 346th overall by the Philadelphia Phillies
Matt Langwell, 11th round, 351st overall by the Cleveland Indians
Matt Clark, 12th round, 375th overall by the San Diego Padres
Ryan Weber, 12th round, 376th overall by the Philadelphia Phillies
Daniel Webb, 12th round, 378th overall by the Arizona Diamondbacks
Juan Perez, 13th round, 387th overall by the San Francisco Giants
Mitch Harris, 13th round, 395th overall by the St. Louis Cardinals
Rob Wooten, 13th round, 398th overall by the Milwaukee Brewers
Tony Campana, 13th round, 401st overall by the Chicago Cubs
Erik Davis, 13th round, 405th overall by the San Diego Padres
B. J. Rosenberg, 13th round, 406th overall by the Philadelphia Phillies
Michael Kohn, 13th round, 409th overall by the Los Angeles Angels of Anaheim
Louis Coleman, 14th round, 421st overall by the Washington Nationals
Michael Schwimer, 14th round, 436th overall by the Philadelphia Phillies
David Phelps, 14th round, 440th overall by the New York Yankees
Jason Gurka, 15th round, 446th overall by the Baltimore Orioles
Joey Butler, 15th round, 453rd overall by the Texas Rangers
Casey Coleman, 15th round, 461st overall by the Chicago Cubs
Tyler Moore, 16th round, 481st overall by the Washington Nationals
Justin Miller, 16th round, 483rd overall by the Texas Rangers
Kolten Wong, 16th round, 486th overall by the Minnesota Twins
Billy Burns, 16th round, 490th overall by the Atlanta Braves
Thad Weber, 16th round, 493rd overall by the Detroit Tigers
Kenny Rivera, 16th round, 499th overall by the Los Angeles Angels of Anaheim
T. J. House, 16th round, 501st overall by the Cleveland Indians
Brad Glenn, 17th round, 514th overall by the Oakland Athletics
Daniel Coulombe, 17th round, 517th overall by the Los Angeles Dodgers
Tom Koehler, 18th round, 538th overall by the Florida Marlins
Allen Webster, 18th round, 547th overall by the Los Angeles Dodgers
Jeff Beliveau, 18th round, 551st overall by the Chicago Cubs
Collin McHugh, 18th round, 554th overall by the New York Mets
Nick Vincent, 18th round, 555th overall by the San Diego Padres
Tyler Cloyd, 18th round, 556th overall by the Philadelphia Phillies
Brian Flynn, 18th round, 562nd overall by the Boston Red Sox
Steve Lombardozzi Jr., 19th round, 571st overall by the Washington Nationals
Xavier Scruggs, 19th round, 575th overall by the St. Louis Cardinals
David Rollins, 19th round, 577th overall by the Los Angeles Dodgers
Steve Susdorf, 19th round, 586th overall by the Philadelphia Phillies
Aaron Barrett, 20th round, 606th overall by the Minnesota Twins
Ryan Lollis, 20th round, 613th overall by the Detroit Tigers
Pat Venditte, 20th round, 620th overall by the New York Yankees
Alex Meyer, 20th round, 622nd overall by the Boston Red Sox
Ryan Carpenter, 21st round, 623 overall by the Tampa Bay Rays, but did not sign
Lucas Luetge, 21st round, 638th overall by the Milwaukee Brewers
Logan Watkins, 21st round, 641st overall by the Chicago Cubs
Blaine Hardy, 22nd round, 655th overall by the Kansas City Royals
Preston Guilmet, 22nd round, 664th overall by the Oakland Athletics
Chris Schwinden, 22nd round, 674th overall by the New York Mets
Anthony DeSclafani, 22nd round, 682nd overall by the Boston Red Sox, but did not sign
Chris Rusin, 23rd round, 694th overall by the Oakland Athletics
Brandon Maurer, 23rd round, 702nd overall by the Seattle Mariners
Tommy Field, 24th round, 737th overall by the Colorado Rockies
Taylor Jungmann, 24th round, 739th overall by the Los Angeles Angels of Anaheim
Taylor Thompson, 25th round, 750th overall by the Chicago White Sox
Tanner Roark, 25th round, 753rd overall by the Texas Rangers
Jerry Sands, 25th round, 757th overall by the Los Angeles Dodgers
Andy Burns, 25th round, 767th overall by the Colorado Rockies
Josh Spence, 25th round, 768th overall by the Arizona Diamondbacks
Cory Mazzoni, 26th round, 781st overall by the Washington Nationals
Dean Anna, 26th round, 795th overall by the San Diego Padres
Elih Villanueva, 27th round, 808th overall by the Florida Marlins
Austin Adams, 27th round, 818th overall by the Milwaukee Brewers
Anthony Rendon, 27th round, 820th overall by the Atlanta Braves, but did not sign
Sonny Gray, 27th round, 821st overall by the Chicago Cubs, but did not sign
Ryan Cook, 27th round, 828th overall by the Arizona Diamondbacks
Hunter Cervenka, 27th round, 832nd overall by the Boston Red Sox
Kevin Mattison, 28th round, 838th overall by the Florida Marlins
Nate Freiman, 28th round, 843rd overall by the Texas Rangers
Dusty Coleman, 28th round, 844th overall by the Oakland Athletics
Chris Heston, 29th round, 871st overall by the Washington Nationals
Keon Broxton, 29th round, 886th overall by the Philadelphia Phillies
Michael Tonkin, 30th round, 906th overall by the Minnesota Twins
James McCann, 31st round, 930th overall by the Chicago White Sox
Mickey Storey, 31st round, 934th overall by the Oakland Athletics
Matt Magill, 31st round, 937th overall by the Los Angeles Dodgers
Sean Gilmartin, 31st round, 945th overall by the San Diego Padres
John Hicks, 31st round, 949th overall by the Los Angeles Angels of Anaheim
Justin Freeman, 32nd round, 959th overall by the Cincinnati Reds
Sam Freeman, 32nd round, 965th overall by the St. Louis Cardinals
Adam Conley, 32nd round, 966th overall by the Minnesota Twins, but did not sign
Nick Christiani, 32nd round, 981st overall by the Cleveland Indians
Travis Shaw, 32nd round, 982nd overall by the Boston Red Sox
Shawn Armstrong, 33rd round, 992nd overall by the Houston Astros, but did not sign
Dan Robertson, 33rd round, 1005th overall by the San Diego Padres
Roberto Perez, 33rd round, 1011th overall by the Cleveland Indians
Marcus Semien, 34th round, 1020th overall by the Chicago White Sox, but did not sign
Jake Elmore, 34th round, 1038th overall by the Arizona Diamondbacks
Andrew Taylor, 34th round, 1039th overall by the Los Angeles Angels of Anaheim
Carson Blair, 35th round, 1072nd overall by the Boston Red Sox
Jon Berti, 36th round, 1084th overall by the Oakland Athletics, but did not sign
Chris Dwyer, 36th round, 1100th overall by the New York Yankees
Adam Warren, 36th round, 1101st overall by the Cleveland Indians
Bradin Hagens, 37th round, 1105th overall by the Kansas City Royals
Matt Andriese, 37th round, 1113th overall by the Texas Rangers
Dallas Beeler, 37th round, 1119th overall by the Toronto Blue Jays
Erik Hamren, 37th round, 1121st overall by the Chicago Cubs
Jarred Cosart, 38th round, 1156th overall by the Philadelphia Phillies
Mikie Mahtook, 39th round, 1168th overall by the Florida Marlins
Brad Miller, 39th round, 1173rd overall by the Texas Rangers
Kyle Hendricks, 39th round, 1189th overall by the Los Angeles Angels of Anaheim, but did not sign
Yan Gomes, 39th round, 1192nd overall by the Boston Red Sox, but did not sign
Donn Roach, 40th round, 1219th overall by the Los Angeles Angels of Anaheim
Kevin Siegrist, 41st round, 1235th overall by the St. Louis Cardinals
Jett Bandy, 41st round, 1237th overall by the Los Angeles Dodgers
Stephen Pryor, 42nd round, 1263rd overall by the Texas Rangers
Brad Brach, 42nd round, 1275th overall by the San Diego Padres
Oliver Drake, 43rd round, 1286th overall by the Baltimore Orioles
Cody Eppley, 43rd round, 1293rd overall by the Texas Rangers
Nick Maronde, 43rd round, 1294th overall by the Oakland Athletics
C. J. Cron, 44th round, 1320th overall by the Chicago White Sox
Scott McGough, 46th round, 1371st overall by the Pittsburgh Pirates
Rob Brantly, 46th round, 1378th overall by the Washington Nationals
J. R. Graham, 46th round, 1381st overall by the Oakland Athletics
Tony Zych, 46th round, 1386th overall by the Chicago Cubs
Giovanni Soto, 46th round, 1390th overall by the Philadelphia Phillies
George Springer, 48th round, 1437th overall by the Minnesota Twins, but did not sign
Alex Dickerson, 48th round, 1432nd overall by the Washington Nationals
Rob Scahill, 48th round, 1448th overall by the New York Yankees
Tyler Anderson, 50th round, 1491st overall by the Minnesota Twins
Sean Nolin, 50th round, 1492nd overall by the Milwaukee Brewers

NFL players drafted
Kyle Long, 23rd round, 690th overall by the Chicago White Sox, but did not sign
Eric Decker, 39th round, 1178th overall by the Milwaukee Brewers, but did not sign
Pat White, 49th round, 1457th overall by the Cincinnati Reds, but did not sign

Notes
On September 9, 2008, Conor Gillaspie, the 37th pick in the 2008 draft, made his Major League debut, becoming the first from his draft class to do so. Buster Posey was the first 2008 draftee to play in post-season and eventually won the 2010 World Series, the 2012 World Series, and the 2014 World Series with the San Francisco Giants.  Posey was also named 2010 NL Rookie of the Year, and he won 2012 National League Most Valuable Player award and the 2012, 2014 & 2015 Silver Slugger awards.

2011 Rookie of the Year Craig Kimbrel was drafted 96th overall by the Atlanta Braves in the 3rd round.

Ryan Westmoreland, who the Boston Red Sox drafted in the fifth round, became one of the best prospects in baseball before having brain surgery twice to repair a cavernous malformation.

Brothers Caleb and Corban Joseph were both chosen in the 2008 draft. The New York Yankees selected Corban in the fourth round, with the 140th overall selection, out of Franklin High School in Franklin, Tennessee, while the Baltimore Orioles drafted Caleb in the seventh round, with the 206th overall selection, out of Lipscomb University.

West Virginia quarterback Pat White was drafted in the 49th round by the Cincinnati Reds, even though he had not played baseball since his senior year of high school in 2004, when he was drafted by the Anaheim Angels.

Negro Leagues Special Draft
Prior to the start of the draft, the League held a special round consisting of the surviving Negro leagues players to acknowledge and rectify their exclusion from the major leagues on the basis of race in the past. The idea of the special draft was conceived by Hall of Famer Dave Winfield. Each major league team drafted one player from the Negro leagues. Notable in the draft were Emilio Navarro (who, at 101 years of age at the time of the draft, was believed to be the oldest living professional ballplayer) and Mamie "Peanut" Johnson, the first woman ever drafted.

References

External links
MLB Important Dates for 2008
2008 MLB Draft Tracker
Baseball America's First Round Recap

Major League Baseball draft
Draft
Major League Baseball draft